Ángela Cremonte is a Spanish-Argentine actress. She is best known for her performance playing Elisa in Cable Girls.

Biography 
Born on 3 April 1985 in Madrid, (or 1982) she is the daughter of Argentinian parents. Cremonte had her debut in a feature film at age 15, performing a minor role in No Pain, No Gain. She earned a licentiate degree in Humanities from the Charles III University of Madrid (UC3M), whereas she received training as a stage actress at La Replika school. With an early career mostly focused on theatre plays, some of her most relevant stage credits include her performances as Ismene in Antigone and Ophelia in Hamlet. In 2010, she landed three breakthrough television roles (in Los hombres de Paco, Hispania, la leyenda and Gran Reserva), which brought her public recognition. In 2021, she had her debut as a writer, with the novel Todos mienten a la noche (Editorial Planeta).

Filmography 

Television

Film

References 

1980s births
Spanish stage actresses
Spanish television actresses
Spanish film actresses
21st-century Spanish actresses
Charles III University of Madrid alumni
Spanish people of Argentine descent
Actresses from Madrid
Living people